A tortillero is a round shaped container which helps keep tortillas warm during a meal. Warm tortillas are placed in the warmer, which is often lined with a cloth or paper napkin. Tortilla warmers made of woven natural fibers, terra cotta, plastic, and styrofoam are available and commonly used in Mexican and Mexican-influenced cultures.

References

Kitchenware
Mexican food preparation utensils